Yengan was a Shan state in what is today Burma. It belonged to the Myelat Division of the Southern Shan States.

Rulers
The rulers of Yengan State bore the title of Ngwegunhmu.

Ngwegunhmus 
c.1857 - 1860              Maung Htun Lin                     (d. c.1864)
1861 - 1886                Maung Nyo Sein                     (d. 1886)
1886                       Maung Thu Daw (1st time)           (b. 1878 - d. 19..)
1886 (10 days)             Mi Thaung (f) 
1896 (25 days)             Maung Chit + Heng Yin Yo
1887 - 19..                Maung Thu Daw (2nd time)           (s.a.)
1887 - May 1898            .... -Regent

References

External links
"Gazetteer of Upper Burma and the Shan states"
The Imperial Gazetteer of India

Shan States
1857 establishments in Asia